The Bombardier Innovia APM 100 C801 (APM 100, originally known as CX-100) is the first generation of an automated people mover (APM) train built by Adtranz (now Bombardier Transportation) for use on the Bukit Panjang LRT (BPLRT).

Operational history 
The C801 trains was operated since the BPLRT was opened. The first train was delivered on 21 January 1999, which is painted in light blue train cars and two turquoise stripes pasted. Later on, since December 2004, trains has been refurbished with the replacing of "Adtranz CX-100" into "Bombardier Innovia APM 100", and were repainted into a single red stripe pasted on the same blue car. These trains used to have LCD displays on each train for advertising purposes, however, these were removed in 2009 due to lack of demand. Currently, the Visual Passenger Information System (VPIS) display current and next station information. The windscreens and windows are tinted green, while spoilt windows have a different tint. Also, C801 trains have rectangular, incandescent headlights compared to the C801A trains, which have circular, bright white LED headlights.

No refurbishment has been made for Bombardier Innovia APM 100 C801 as it will be replaced eventually at the end of the physical lifespan.

Some train cars were installed with solar windscreen on one of the car ends. This was to minimize heat and light from entering the trains, which were one of the main causes for warmer trains. The experimental windscreens were successful as they were subsequently rolled out to other train cars.

Car 116 was installed with the new bright LEDs that was used in the C801A trains, replacing the existing yellow headlights. All train cars except for six of them, have been replaced by brand new LED headlights. As the carriages are closed-end, the train must be stationary and the doors must be open for passengers to move between carriages during 2-car operations. Passengers have the ability to sit on the either end of the car, which creates more standing space. All seats in the interior are standardised into turquoise seats, which is the previous LRT colour before it was standardised into grey in 2003. It has 4 seats on each end and 8 seats in the middle. C801 trains have rectangular, incandescent headlights compared to the C801A trains, which have circular, bright white LED headlights.

Defects in the C801 rolling stock 
Minor defects in the C801 rolling stock was made public in a press report made by operator SMRT Trains managing director Lee Ling Wee in 2016, when it was admitted that C801 trains had suffered from cracks. This was after the cracks from the rolling stock C151A trains, which runs on East West line and North South line, were made public on 5 July 2016 which caused a public uproar (See Operational Problems in C151A). According to the press report, the cracks was discovered "during a routine assessment by Bombardier in 2015" and the issue affected all 19 C801 trains. It was stated that 12 of them have fixed locally using wielding methods with remaining 7 awaiting for repairs as of time the report was published, having suffered the issue to a lesser degree.

Lee did not reveal what caused the cracks, but a spokesman for Land Transport Authority told Straits Times that the issue is caused by "normal wear and tear" and added that they are not 'safety-critical'. All cracks in C801 trains were found on the "lateral beams of the under-frame" and they measured "no more than 12 cm".

Replacement 
On 7 March 2018, the Land Transport Authority awarded the contract for renewing the Bukit Panjang LRT system to Original Equipment Manufacturer (OEM) Bombardier (Singapore) at a cost of $344 million. Under the contract, all of the 19 C801 trains would be withdrawn from service, and replaced by Bombardier Innovia APM 300R C801B automated people mover cars.

Livery

Train formation 
The configuration of a C801 in revenue service is just the one car. With both the motors and the third rail current collectors, the train cars can be coupled up to 2 cars during service.

The car numbers of the trains range from 101 to 119. Individual cars are assigned a three-digit serial number by the rail operator SMRT Trains. A trainset consists of one motor car, e.g. set 101 is car 101. The first digit is always a 1, while the last two digits identify the car number.
 Adtranz (now Bombardier Transportation) built sets 101–119.

References 

Bombardier Transportation people movers
Innovia people movers
Adtranz multiple units
Bombardier Transportation multiple units
Light Rail Transit (Singapore) rolling stock